Rowena He or He Xiaoqing (Traditional Chinese: 何曉清; Simplified Chinese: 何晓清; b. 1972) is a history scholar on the 1989 Tiananmen Square protests and massacre and is Associate Professor at the Department of History in the Chinese University of Hong Kong.

Biography
Born and raised in Guangdong province, He obtained her Bachelor of Arts at South China Normal University. During the Tiananmen Square protest, she was a seventeen-year-old secondary school student and has joined student-organised pro-democracy movements. Because of the oppressing experiences during that time, she decided to find the lost voices in this historical event and specialised in the study of the June 4th event.

She finished both her Master of Arts and Doctor of Philosophy in 2002 and 2008 respectively at the University of Toronto, supervised by historian Merle Goldman and political scientist Roderick MacFarquhar. After her graduate studies, she joined Fairbank Center for Chinese Studies at Harvard University as a Postdoctoral Fellow between 2008 and 2010. Her first book, Tiananmen Exiles: Voices of the Struggle for Democracy in China, was named one of the Top Five China Books of 2014 by the Asia Society's China File. From 2010 to 2015, she was Lecturer at the Faculty of Arts and Science at Harvard and has started the lecture 'Rebels With a Cause: Tiananmen in History and Memory'. During this teaching period, she received teaching awards in three successive years. Despite being a frequent recipient of teaching awards, she was continuously criticised by Mainland Chinese students for her intention to teach and research on this topic. Between 2018 and 2019, She was a Research Fellow at the Institute for Advanced Study in Princeton, New Jersey, before she took up the position of Associate Professor at the Department of History in the Chinese University of Hong Kong.

She was designated among the Top 100 Chinese Public Intellectuals of 2016. She was selected a member of the Institute for Advanced Study (2018-2019) and is still a research associate of Fairbank Center for Chinese Studies. She has also taught Wellesley College, and Saint Michael's College, Vermont.

Writings 

 Tiananmen Exiles: Voices of the Struggle for Democracy in China. New York: Palgrave Macmillan, April 2014.

References

1972 births
1989 Tiananmen Square protests and massacre
Academic staff of the Chinese University of Hong Kong
Harvard University faculty
Living people
South China Normal University alumni
University of Toronto alumni